Central African Republic League is the top football league in the Central African Republic It was created in 1968. The league is sanctioned by the Central African Football Federation, the governing body of football in the CAR.

Central African Republic Premier League – 2021–22 season

Central African Republic Premier League - clubs 2016
Anégrée Freese (Bangui)
AS Tempête Mocaf (Bangui)
ASDR Fatima (Bangui)
DFC8 (Bangui)
Espérance FC du 5ème Arrondissement (Bangui)
FC Force de Défense et de Sécurité (Bangui)
Olympic Rèal de Bangui (Bangui)
Rèal Comboni (Bangui)
Red Star Bangui (Bangui)
Sica Sport (Bangui)
SOS FC de Gbangouma (Bangui)
Stade Centrafricain (Bangui)

Previous winners

1968 : US Cattin
1969 : Unknown
1970 : Unknown
1971 : Réal Olympique Castel
1972 : Unknown
1973 : Réal Olympique Castel
1974 : ASDR Fatima
1975 : Réal Olympique Castel
1976 : AS Tempête Mocaf
1977 : Stade Centrafricain
1978 : ASDR Fatima
1979 : Réal Olympique Castel
1980 : USCA
1981 : Publique Sportive Mouara
1982 : Réal Olympique Castel
1983 : ASDR Fatima
1984 : AS Tempête Mocaf
1985 : Stade Centrafricain
1986 : Publique Sportive Mouara
1987 : Unknown
1988 : ASDR Fatima
1989 : Stade Centrafricain
1990 : AS Tempête Mocaf
1991 : FACA
1992 : USCA
1993 : AS Tempête Mocaf
1994 : AS Tempête Mocaf
1995 : FACA
1996 : AS Tempête Mocaf
1997 : AS Tempête Mocaf
1998 : Discontinued
1999 : AS Tempête Mocaf
2000 : Olympic Real de Bangui
2001 : Olympic Real de Bangui
2002 : Annulled
2003 : AS Tempête Mocaf
2004 : Olympic Real de Bangui
2005 : ASDR Fatima
2006 : DFC 8
2007 : Unknown
2008 : Stade Centrafricain
2009 : AS Tempête Mocaf
2010 : Olympic Real de Bangui
2011 : DFC 8
2012 : Olympic Real de Bangui
2013–14 : AS Tempête Mocaf
2014–15 : Not held
2015–16 : DFC 8
2016 : Olympic Real de Bangui
2016–17 : Olympic Real de Bangui
2018 : Stade Centrafricain
2018-19 : AS Tempête Mocaf
2019-20 : Abandoned
2020-21 : DFC 8
2021–22 : Olympic Real de Bangui

Performance By club

References

External links
Football for the Peoples. Central African Rep.
RSSSF competition history

Football leagues in the Central African Republic
Central